The 2004–05 Elite Ice Hockey League season was the second season of the British Elite Ice Hockey League (EIHL). Manchester Phoenix did not ice due as they could not agree a deal with the Manchester Evening News Arena.

The second season of the EIHL saw a series of games between the EIHL clubs and the members of the British National League (BNL). In addition to three home games and three away games against their Elite opponents, each club also played one home game and one away game against the BNL clubs in crossover matchups. Results in these crossover games would count towards a team's points tally. The NHL lockout also saw a number of National Hockey League (NHL) players join British clubs. Coventry Blaze won a Grand Slam of all three titles, winning the Championship with an overtime victory over the Nottingham Panthers.

The crossover games with the BNL clubs were seen by many to be the first stage towards the amalgamation of the two organisations into one league. However, early in the season it was revealed that teams including Edinburgh Capitals and Newcastle Vipers were seeking to resign from the BNL and join the Elite League. A withdrawal of  these clubs would leave the BNL with only a small number of participating teams. This situation led to the resigning teams temporarily withdrawing their Elite League applications and entering into collective discussions on the entire BNL joining the EIHL instead. The Elite League offered the BNL clubs invitations to join the EIHL structure, which were declined due to unfavourable terms. Subsequently Edinburgh and Newcastle resubmitted individual applications to the Elite League, both of which were accepted. A combination of this and Bracknell Bees owner John Nike's announcement that he was withdrawing funding from the BNL team prompted the collapse of the BNL at the end of the 2004–05 season.

Challenge Cup
During the early part of the season, the results from league games also counted towards a separate Challenge Cup table. However, in a change to the previous season, there were two groups of teams, Group A with three teams and Group B with four teams. After each team had played each team in their group once at home and once away, the top two teams of each group qualified for the semi finals.

Group A

1 1 point awarded for an overtime loss.

Group B

1 1 point awarded for an overtime loss.

Semi-finals
Winner A (Coventry) vs Runner-up B (Nottingham)
Coventry Blaze 2–1 Nottingham Panthers
Nottingham Panthers 3–3 Coventry Blaze (Coventry win 5–4 on aggregate)

Winner B (Cardiff) vs Runner-up A (Sheffield)
Sheffield Steelers 2–2 Cardiff Devils
Cardiff Devils 3–1 Sheffield Steelers (Cardiff win 5–3 on aggregate)

Final
First Leg
Coventry Blaze 6–1 Cardiff Devils

Second Leg
Cardiff Devils 4–5 Coventry Blaze (Coventry win 11–5 on aggregate)

Elite League Table
The top six teams qualified for the playoffs.

Elte League Play Offs
The top six teams qualified for the playoffs. Group A consisted of Coventry, Nottingham and London while Group B consisted of Belfast, Cardiff and Sheffield. Each team played the other teams in its group twice at home and twice away. The top two of each group then qualified for the playoff weekend at the National Ice Centre in Nottingham.

Group A

Group B

Semi-finals
Winner A vs Runner-up B
Coventry Blaze 3–0 Sheffield Steelers

Winner B vs Runner-up A
Cardiff Devils 1–3 Nottingham Panthers

Third place playoff
Loser A vs Loser B
Sheffield Steelers 4–2 Cardiff Devils

Final
Winner A vs Winner B
Coventry Blaze 2–1 Nottingham Panthers (after overtime)

Other competitions

Crossover Cup

Awards
Coach of the Year Trophy – Paul Thompson, Coventry Blaze
Player of the Year Trophy – Tony Hand, Belfast Giants and Neal Martin, Coventry Blaze
Ice Hockey Annual Trophy – Tony Hand, Belfast Giants
Best British Forward – Tony Hand, Belfast Giants

All Star teams

Scoring leaders
The scoring leaders are taken from all league games.

Most points: 76 Dan Carlson, Coventry Blaze
Most goals: 37 Adam Calder, Coventry Blaze
Most assists: 55 Tony Hand, Belfast Giants
Most PIMs: 490 Andre Payette, Coventry Blaze

References 
 Ice Hockey Journalists UK
 The Internet Hockey Database
 Malcolm Preen's Ice Hockey Results and Tables

Footnotes 

UK
Elite Ice Hockey League seasons
1